, meaning "black mountain", may refer to:

In the Mandarin Chinese reading Hēishān:

In the Korean reading Heuksan (also spelled Hǔksan; written in Hangul as ):
Heuksan Island in the Yellow Sea, administratively part of Sinan County, Jeollanam-do, South Korea

In the Japanese kun-yomi Kuroyama (written in Shinjitai as ):
Kuroyama Station, Hakushin Line station in Niigata, Niigata Prefecture, Japan

See also

Black Mountain (disambiguation), for names with a similar meaning in other languages
Heishan (disambiguation)